Delphi Lawrence (23 March 1932 – 11 April 2002) was an English actress.
She was educated at Halidon House School in Slough, Berkshire, whilst living in Colnbrook. 

Born to Barbara Yvonne ( Enever) and Louis Holzman, who wed in 1930, she was of Hungarian ancestry on her father's side. She trained as a concert pianist before becoming an actress, training at RADA and graduating in 1949. She made her first film in 1952, and, over the next decade, she established a following in British films. She graduated to lead roles but almost exclusively in "B" films.

Career

In 1962, she starred in episode 11 of The Saint ("The Man Who Was Lucky") as Cora. One of her other prominent TV roles was around the same time, in 1961, where she played the countess in episode 6 of the TV historical adventure series Sir Francis Drake ("The English Dragon").

In 1966, she moved to the United States where she began to appear in films and television, and settled there. By the end of the 1960s her roles began to decrease in frequency and importance and in 1973 she retired. She made a brief return in 1975 in the Broadway production of The Constant Wife playing the sister of Ingrid Bergman's character.

She appeared as Vera Charles in various touring productions of Mame, opposite such stars as  Susan Hayward, Celeste Holm, Ann Sothern, and Juliet Prowse playing the lead role (Mame Dennis). The last of these was in 1990, opposite Prowse. She died 12 years later, in 2002, aged 70, from undisclosed causes.

Selected filmography

 Blood Orange (1953) – Chelsea, a model
 Murder by Proxy (1954) – Linda (uncredited)
 Meet Mr. Callaghan (1954) – Effie Perkins
 Duel in the Jungle (1954) – Pan American Girl
 Barbados Quest (1955) – Jean Larson
 Doublecross (1956) – Anna Krassin
 The Feminine Touch (1956) – Pat
 It's Never Too Late (1956) – Mrs. Madge Dixon
 Strangers' Meeting (1957) – Margot Sanders
 Just My Luck (1957) – Miss Daviot
 Blind Spot (1958) – Yvonne Dubar
 The Son of Robin Hood (1958) – Sylvia
 Dial 999 (TV series) (1959) – Julie Nielson – (episode "The Mechanical Watchman") – (filmed 1958)
 Dial 999 (TV series) (1959) – Pauline – (episode "Thames Division") – (filmed 1958)
 Too Many Crooks (1959) – Secretary
 The Man Who Could Cheat Death (1959) – Margo Philippe
 Danger Man (1960-62) – Stella Delroy – (episode "View from the Villa")
 Cone of Silence (1960) – Joyce Mitchell
 The Greeneyed Elephant (1960) (Danish title: Elefanter på loftet) – Lisa
 Beat Girl (1960) – Greta (uncredited)
 Edgar Wallace Mysteries,  (episode "The Fourth Square") (1961) – Nina Stewart
 Seven Keys (1961) – Natalie Worth
 Scotland Yard (film series), (episode "The Square Mile Murder") (1961) – Mrs. Possner
 The List of Adrian Messenger (1963) – Airport Stewardess (uncredited)
 Farewell Performance (1963) – Janice Marlon
 Gideon's Way (episode "To Catch A Tiger") (1964) – Jane Kennet
 Bunny Lake Is Missing (1965) – 1st Mother
 The Last Challenge (1967) – Marie Webster
 Cops and Robbers (1973) – rich lady (final film role)

References

Sources
 Quinlan, David. Quinlan's Film Stars Batsford Books, 1996.

External links

English film actresses
English stage actresses
Actresses from Hertfordshire
1926 births
2002 deaths
English people of Hungarian descent
English expatriates in the United States